Michael Conrad Stenger (July 11, 1950 – June 27, 2022) was an American law enforcement officer who served as the 41st Sergeant at Arms of the United States Senate from April 16, 2018, to January 7, 2021.

Early life and career 
Stenger was a native of Wood-Ridge, New Jersey. He graduated from Fairleigh Dickinson University with a Bachelor of Arts degree and was a captain in the United States Marine Corps before joining the United States Secret Service.

Career 
Stenger spent 35 years in the Secret Service and served stints as Assistant Director for the Office of Investigations and the Assistant Director of the Office of Protective Research. In 2008, he became Assistant Director for the USSS Office of Government and Public Affairs, which coordinated with groups that included the United States Congress. In 2011, he joined the office of the Sergeant at Arms of the United States Senate as Assistant Sergeant at Arms for the Office of Protective Services and Continuity, became Deputy Sergeant at Arms in May 2014, and Chief of Staff for the Sergeant at Arms in January 2015.

On April 16, 2018, after Sergeant at Arms Frank J. Larkin retired, Michael C. Stenger was nominated as the 41st Sergeant at Arms under Senate Resolution 465, put forth by Senate Majority Leader Mitch McConnell. This resolution was submitted in the Senate, considered, and agreed to without amendment by unanimous consent.

Responding to the 2021 Capitol attack 
On January 6, 2021, for more than an hour during the violent storming of the Capitol that resulted in physical and symbolic harm to the Congress, the Capitol, and the process of accepting and counting the votes of the Electoral College, Stenger and House Sergeant-at-arms Paul Irving (members of the Capitol Review Board) repeatedly refused to request the assistance of the U.S. National Guard. The following day, he resigned as the Senate sergeant-at-arms, with his deputy Jennifer Hemingway taking over on an interim basis.  The two other top Capitol security officials—House sergeant-at-arms Paul D. Irving and United States Capitol Police chief Steven Sund—also resigned on the same day, amid bipartisan shock and outrage over security lapses that led to the mob's breach and occupation of the Capitol.

Personal life and death
Stenger was married to the former Janet Oechsner, and they had two children. He died from natural causes on June 27, 2022, at the age of 71.

References

External links 
 Senate profile
 
 

1950 births
2022 deaths
Fairleigh Dickinson University alumni
People from Falls Church, Virginia
People from Wood-Ridge, New Jersey
Place of birth missing
Sergeants at Arms of the United States Senate
United States Secret Service agents
January 6 United States Capitol attack